Newfoundland and Labrador first required its residents to register their motor vehicles and display licence plates in 1920, while still a British dominion. It became a province of Canada in 1949.

The 1956 (dated 1957) issue was the first Newfoundland licence plate that fully complied with these standards: the issues from 1951 (dated 1952) through 1955 (dated 1956) were all 6 inches in height by 12 inches in width, but had non-standard mounting holes.

The last complete re-registration of all registered vehicles in Newfoundland and Labrador was in 1981, with a switch from a numerical system to an alphanumeric system.

All plates issued since 1982 (beginning AAA-001) remain valid today. Plates remain with the vehicle to which they are originally registered, rather than with the owner. Used vehicles with expired plates are issued new licence plates, while used vehicles with valid plates retain their original licence plate.

Since 1985, the province has not used the letters I, Q, U or Y on licence plates, except on plates that use "VO1" (or "VO2" for Labrador) followed by two or three letters issued to Amateur radio operators. However, the HAY series was issued on the 1996-97 Cabot 500 base, while the TFI series was issued on trailers in 2010. The letter I is skipped because it closely resembles the number 1, while the letter Q is skipped because it closely resembles the letter O (which the province does use) and the number zero.

Since September 1997, the province requires only a rear plate for most registrations, except for B, C, E and G plates (see below). Some older cars still display both front and rear plates. Some early "World of Difference" and Cabot 500 base plates were issued in duplicate for the front and rear.

In 2019 the province announced  it would be designing license plates for green vehicles.

On Newfoundland licence plates, the first letter (or two letters) designates the registration class of the vehicle. For example, HMT-999 would be assigned to a passenger car, while TZD-019 would be assigned to a trailer.

Newfoundland and Labrador is the only province in Canada that does not allow vanity license plates to be registered.

Vehicle class

Passenger baseplates

1925 to 1969

1970 to present

Green Vehicle plates
In November 2019, the Newfoundland and Labrador government announced a prototype design for a Green vehicle license plate. Premier Dwight Ball made the announcement at the Drive Electric NL Electric Vehicle Showcase. As of 2022, this plate design has not yet been made available; electric vehicles simply use plates from the main series.

Commercial baseplates

Non-passenger plates

Government plates

Specialty plates

References

External links
Newfoundland and Labrador licence plates, 1969–present

Newfoundland and Labrador
Transport in Newfoundland and Labrador
Newfoundland and Labrador-related lists